Bailar Contigo may refer to:

Music
 "Bailar Contigo" (Carlos Vives song), 2013
 "Bailar Contigo" (Black Eyed Peas and Daddy Yankee song), 2022